Cerura is a genus of moths of the family Notodontidae described by Franz von Paula Schrank in 1802.

Species

Cerura australis Scott, 1864
Cerura dayongi Schintlmeister & Fang, 2001
Cerura delavoiei (Gaschet, 1876)
Cerura erminea (Esper, 1783)
Cerura felina Butler, 1877
Cerura iberica (Ortiz & Templado, 1966)
Cerura kandyia Moore
Cerura liturata Walker, 1855
Cerura malaysiana Holloway, 1982
Cerura menciana Moore, 1877
Cerura multipunctata Bethune-Baker, 1904
Cerura priapus Schintlmeister, 1997
Cerura przewalskyi (Alphéraky, 1882)
Cerura subrosea (Matsumura, 1927)
Cerura tattakana Matsumura, 1927
Cerura thomasi Schintlmeister, 1993
Cerura vinula (Linnaeus, 1758)

References

Notodontidae
Moth genera
Taxa named by Franz von Paula Schrank